George Barry O'Toole (1886 – 26 March 1944) was a founding member of the Catholic Radical Alliance.  He was important for clarifying the right of Catholics to conscientious objector status.  He began his religious career as a parish priest, and as a U.S. Army chaplain in World War I.

Education career
He taught philosophy at both St. Vincent College, Latrobe, Pennsylvania and Seton Hill College.
He was the first president (rector) of the Catholic University of Peking.  He also was the head of the Philosophy department at Duquesne University.

Labor activities
He was a founding member of the Catholic Radical Alliance, an early labor support organization in Pittsburgh, Pennsylvania, and was important to the foundation of St. Joseph's House of Hospitality, also in Pittsburgh.

Pacifist activities
In 1939, he stated that a just war was nearly impossible, because the "modern abuse of universal conscription" made wars on so gigantic a scale as to be unjustifiable.  Later he testified before a Senate hearing in opposition to the Burke-Wadsworth Act, a conscription act pending before Congress in 1940.

Creationism

O'Toole was the author of the creationist book The Case Against Evolution (1925). The book was dismissed by academics as a "religious and not a scientific work".

Science writer Martin Gardner noted that O'Toole endorsed the "naive criticism of strata chronology" from creationist George McCready Price.

Publications
 George Barry O'Toole (1925). The Case Against Evolution. The Macmillan Company.
 Ch'ien-li Ying and George Barry O'Toole (1929). The Nestorian Tablet at Sianfu: A New English Translation of the Inscription and a History of the Stone. Peking Leader Press, Peking.
 George Barry O'Toole. (1929). John of Montecorvino, First Archbishop of Peking. Latrobe, Pennsylvania.
 George Barry O'Toole and Quianli Ying (1931). Luo ji xue: Zhong Ying dui zhao. Beijing. .
 George Barry O'Toole and Theodore Jeske-Choinski (1936). The Last Romans "Ostatni Rzymianie": A Tale of the Time of Theodosius the Great. Pittsburgh, Pennsylvania.
 George Barry O'Toole (1941). War and Conscription at the Bar of Christian Morals. Catholic Worker Press.
 Bishop Joseph M. Corrigan and George Barry O'Toole, editors (1944). Racism and Christianity; Race: Nation: Person. Social Aspects of the Race Problem, A Symposium. Barnes & Noble, Inc., New York. .

References

1944 deaths
1886 births
American Christian creationists
History of Catholicism in the United States
Religious leaders from Pittsburgh
Roman Catholic activists
History of labor relations in the United States
Catholic Workers
American Benedictines
World War I chaplains
Roman Catholic missionaries in China
Academic staff of Fu Jen Catholic University
United States Army chaplains
Seton Hill University
American Christian pacifists
Catholic pacifists
20th-century American Roman Catholic priests